is a 1999 Japanese TV movie, which is a take on the 1835 fairy tale "Thumbelina". Being a part of the  series, the movie stars Chiaki Kuriyama.

Story
Saeko Machida is a 16-year-old studious high-school girl who has a crush on a boy in her class named Yuichi Kimijima. Being deeply obsessed with him, she tries to gain his attention while stalking him, but without success. One day, she meets a strange man at a flea-market who gives her a red liquid, telling her that if she splashes it on Yuichi, her wish will become true. She acquires the liquid, certain that the liquid will cause Yuuichi to love her. Saeko finally gets the courage to confess her love to Yuichi, but he rejects her. Disappointed, she splashes the liquid on Yuichi. However, the liquid actually causes him to shrink, making him about three inches in height. She takes him home and desperately tries to get Yuichi to love her, but he still does not have feelings for her. Things will soon take a turn for the worse, when she realizes she can do whatever she wants as far as controlling and torturing him. He even attempted to run away, but failed.

The school staff began to suspect that Yuichi has gone missing. Later on, Saeko starts to have a new look following Yuichi's disappearance, causing Misa and her friends at her school to grow suspicious of her. They send Aya Morimoto, Saeko's only friend, to find out in return for 500 yen. She stealthy follows her and hides in the stall next to Saeko in the bathroom and witnesses her with Yuichi tied up on her cell phone and threatens to flush him away if he's going to run away again. After hearing a noise, Saeko realizes that Aya knows the truth of his disappearance and chases after her. While trying to outrun her, Saeko caught Aya and spills the red liquid in order to prevent her from telling everyone about what happened to Yuichi. The next day, Misa confronts her about Aya's disappearance at the girls' gym locker room. Saeko displays both Aya and Yuichi in the chain attached to her phone and threatens Misa to do the same if she ever told anyone.

Meanwhile, Yuichi tries to encourage Aya to stand up to her and seek help. After Saeko returns home from school, Yuichi distracts her by convincing her to take him on a day alone. Their departure allows Aya to send a cry for help to her brother via email. While they are out, Saeko falls to the ground when the dog jumps at her, allowing Yuichi to escape. Failing to find him, she returns home and finds the email Aya sent. The furious Saeko catches Aya attempting to escape while hiding inside a paper-made Sumo wrestler and crushes her to death with her shoe. She then picks up Aya's corpse with a tissue and disposes her in the trash bin. Yuichi ends up in the hidden area near the tunnel filled with the colony of four small men inside who rescue him from the elements and take him to their shelter in a wall inside the train station. The next morning, Aya's older brother visits Saeko at her house and asked her about Aya's disappearance, but she denied her involvement. Upon waking up inside a napkin from a hamburger place he worked at, Yuichi thanks the tiny men for saving him and learns that he unwittingly kept them alive by tossing half an eaten hamburger in the sewers.

Meanwhile at the school, Misa unsuccessfully attempt to warn her friends, the school staff, and even the police about Saeko. However, only Aya's older brother takes her warning seriously and asks for her to trust him. At first, Misa is shocked by this and thinks he's crazy to want to talk to her. However, she quickly realizes that Aya's older brother is the only one who believes her and puts her trust in him. During his time in the tiny colony, Yuichi discovers that the men has chosen to shrink themselves about three inches tall for any reason they have which includes avoiding trouble with the law. He feels out of place and reveals to the group that he was shrunken by force because of Saeko's unrequited love for him. The men feel bad for Yuichi's plight and one man decides to take action but the other men tries to convince him not to get involved due to his drunken nature.

In the next scene, Aya's brother shows up with the police in Saeko's room to search for clues. During the investigation, detectives uncover evidence during the investigation such as Saeko's fan-like webpage containing facts about Yuichi, a dollhouse used as Yuichi's house, a knife used as torture, and a blood-stained shoe. One detective tries to console Saeko's disbelieving parents while the lead detective discovered a shrunken, crushed Aya in the trash can and shows the body to them. Saeko's parents faints upon realizing that their own daughter is now a murderer, and Aya's brother screams in horror. As Saeko returns near her home, she finds it's being marked off with crime scene tape by the police and flees. The neighbors sees her fleeing from the scene of the crime in the neighborhood. They realize the truth in Misa's warning about Saeko and suspects her in both Yuichi's disappearance and Aya's murder.

Now a suspect on the run, Saeko is seen wearing a hat and is trying to keep a low profile. She observes a newspaper article that contains Aya's murder and discovery on the front page. She also sees Misa giving details about her on the TV displayed on the front window of the shop. At this point, people now believe her warning about Saeko shrinking them. Even her disbelieving classmates rally to Misa's side by claiming that she had a suspicious and devious smile when she threatened to shrink them too. Saeko panics as her photo appeared on the screen and takes off. While sitting on the stairs near the tunnel, she cries out for Yuichi's help to save her from being arrested and finds a small man attempting to tie her shoe laces together. She used the man to find Yuichi and discovers him along with other small men he joined as refuge. Yuichi coldly rejects Saeko's request to help her out and tells her off that she deserved on whatever's coming to her. He also told her that he's happy being with the colony and that she's better off without him after all the mistreatment he endured in being shrunken against his will and torturing him along with Aya. Saeko leaves while the men cheer him on.

Alone and depressed, Saeko attempts suicide by throwing herself off the bridge into the road below, but is saved by the flea-market man who just happened to be nearby. While talking to him, the flea-market man asks her if she got everything she desired in using his red shrinking potion. Saeko admitted to him that she got nothing from it and that her lovesick obsession had only brought her more trouble. She mentions that she now knows that Yuichi hates her for not only shrinking him, but also keeping him against his will. Saeko shows remorse in her actions for torturing both him and killing Aya, her own best friend. The flea-market man understands her pain and reveals that he hated women in general because women were made to love, but never to be loved. As part of her guilt, Saeko asks for the flea-market man for one last favor by letting her switch places with Yuichi since she should've been a lot happier watching him from afar rather than continuing to be lovesick over him. The man later talks to the leader of the small colony and asks him to have Yuichi so he can grow him back to normal. The leader is reluctant on this request because while he trusts the man, he mentions that Yuichi's now part of the group and is happy with them. However, the flea-market man is able to convince him that Yuichi didn't choose to be tiny and his family misses him. The leader agrees to the request upon realizing how much it means to Yuichi to be reunited with his family.

The man takes the sleeping Yuichi to the park bench and uses the blue liquid and grows him back to his normal size. Yuichi awoke and is jubilant on being back to his normal size. The man then gives the now-shrunken Saeko to him. She apologized to Yuichi about her actions and he not only forgives her, but also told her that he loves her. As they walked out of a park, the movie ends with the "End" sign displaying on the screen. However, it is not how the movie really ends.

In the real ending, a subsequent scene reveals Saeko inside a bird cage after being turned in to the authorities by Yuichi, who observes on the TV screen by the front window display of the shop. The TV shows the authorities have told the reporters that he is cooperating with them and will testify in the trial against her. The reporters surround Saeko's cage wanting answers from her in why she'd killed Aya and held Yuichi hostage for so long. The TV shows that she is suffering a panic attack and distressed by this. The authorities tries to hold the reporters back and away from the stressed out Saeko. Yuichi walks away with a satisfied look on his face, knowing that she will answer for her crimes.

Cast
Chiaki Kuriyama（栗山千明） Saeko Machida
Issei Takahashi （高橋一生） Yuichi Kimizima
Erina Asai （浅井江理名） Aya Morimoto
Hisoka Yamamoto （山本密） Strange man (or Flea-Market man)
Shin Yazawa （矢沢心） Misa
Yoshiaki Umegaki （梅垣義明） Saeko's father
Kimiko Ikeda （池田喜美子） Saeko's mother
Sarutoki Minakawa （皆川猿時）Highschool teacher

Current condition
The movie is difficult to find, since it was only released on VHS, shortly before the era of DVD. Today it is out of print, and no longer for sale anywhere. However, the movie is available through YouTube.

See also
:ja:コワイ童話(Written in Japanese)
Tokyo Broadcasting System

External links

1999 films
1990s Japanese-language films
Fiction about size change
Japanese teen films
Teen fantasy films
1999 fantasy films
Films based on Thumbelina
Television shows based on works by Hans Christian Andersen
1990s Japanese films